The 1915 Norwegian Football Cup was the 14th season of the Norwegian annual knockout football tournament. The tournament was open for 1915 local association leagues (kretsserier) champions. Odd won their sixth title, having beaten Kvik (Fredrikshald) in the final.

First round

|colspan="3" style="background-color:#97DEFF"|12 September 1915

|}

Odd and Lyn (Gjøvik) had a walkover.

Second round

|colspan="3" style="background-color:#97DEFF"|26 September 1915

|}

Kvik (Trondhjem) had a walkover.

Semi-finals

|colspan="3" style="background-color:#97DEFF"|3 October 1915

|}

Final

See also
1915 in Norwegian football

References

Norwegian Football Cup seasons
Norway
Football Cup